is a Japanese voice actress from Kitakyushu, Fukuoka Prefecture who is affiliated with Mausu Promotion. After graduating from the Yoyogi Animation School in Fukuoka, she joined Mausu Production in 2015. She is known for her roles as Rin Kurosawa in Aikatsu! and Aoba Suzukaze in the 2016 anime television series New Game!, where she performed the opening and ending themes with Megumi Yamaguchi, Ayumi Takeo, and Megumi Toda under the name Fourfolium.

Filmography

Anime
2014
Blade & Soul
Fate/stay night: Unlimited Blade Works as students
Shōnen Hollywood as Girl

2015
Aikatsu! as Rin Kurosawa
Osomatsu-san as a female student

2016
New Game! as Aoba Suzukaze

2017
Armed Girl's Machiavellism as Rin Onigawara
Miss Kobayashi's Dragon Maid as Elma (eps. 8 - 13)
New Game!! as Aoba Suzukaze

2018
A Certain Magical Index III as Lessar
Aikatsu Friends! as Momone Yūki
Bloom Into You as Yuu Koito
Mitsuboshi Colors as Yui Akamatsu 
Ulysses: Jeanne d'Arc and the Alchemist Knight as Philip

2020
By the Grace of the Gods as Mizelia
Infinite Dendrogram as Babylon
Kaguya-sama: Love is War? as Rei Onodera
King's Raid: Successors of the Will as Reina
Maesetsu! as Manatsu Kogarashi
Super HxEros as Yona Ichōgi

2021
Miss Kobayashi's Dragon Maid S as Elma
The World's Finest Assassin Gets Reincarnated in Another World as an Aristocrat as Tarte

2022
Girls' Frontline as Destroyer (eps. 8–10)
Kaguya-sama: Love Is War -Ultra Romantic- as Rei Onodera
In the Heart of Kunoichi Tsubaki as Suzushiro
Shinobi no Ittoki as Shione Kо̄zuki

2023
Bullbuster as Miyuki Shirogane
Malevolent Spirits as Botan Nagatsuki

Original video animation (OVA)
Armed Girl's Machiavellism (2017) as Rin Onigawara
Thus Spoke Kishibe Rohan (2018) as Naoko's Daughter (ep. 2)
Onna no Sono no Hoshi (2022) as Yuka Kurata

Films
Bayonetta: Bloody Fate
HappinessCharge PreCure! Ningyō no Kuni no Ballerina

Video games
Shironeko Project as Mikan Karatachi
Tokyo 7th Sisters as Musubi Tendōji
Aikatsu! My No.1 Stage as Rin Kurosawa
Nights of Azure
Girls' Frontline as SR-3MP
The Idolmaster Cinderella Girls as Yoshino Yorita
New Game!: The Challenge Stage as Aoba Suzukaze
Blue Reflection as Hinako Shirai
Alice Gear Aegis as Eri Yorishiro
King's Raid as Reina
Food Fantasy as Jiuniang
 Onsen Musume as Yuina Kusatsu
Atelier Online as Sorrel
A Certain Magical Virtual-On as Lessar
Code Vein as Rin Murasame
Azur Lane as KMS Z18, HMS Icarus
Fire Emblem Heroes as Tharja, Rhajat, Cherche
Blue Archive as Saiba Midori
The Caligula Effect 2 as Kranke
Blue Reflection: Second Light as Hinako Shirai
Alchemy Stars as Elma
The Future You’ve Been Dreaming Of as Sachi Usui
Honkai: Star Rail as Tingyun

Others
Ane no Shinyuu, Watashi no Koibito as Sena (promotional video)

References

External links
Official agency profile 

1993 births
Living people
Voice actresses from Fukuoka Prefecture
Voice actors from Kitakyushu
Japanese video game actresses
Japanese voice actresses
21st-century Japanese actresses
Mausu Promotion voice actors